Pasir Mas is a federal constituency in Pasir Mas District, Kelantan, Malaysia, that has been represented in the Dewan Rakyat since 1955 to 1959 and 1974 to present.

The federal constituency was created in the 1955 redistribution and is mandated to return a single member to the Dewan Rakyat under the first past the post voting system.

Demographics 
https://live.chinapress.com.my/ge15/parliament/KELANTAN

History

Polling districts
According to the federal gazette issued on 31 October 2022, the Pasir Mas constituency is divided into 35 polling districts.

Representation history

State constituency

Current state assembly members

Local governments

Election results

References

Kelantan federal constituencies
Constituencies established in 1955
Constituencies disestablished in 1959